Sumayhan Al-Nabit (born 27 March 1996) is a Saudi Arabian professional footballer who plays as a winger for Pro League side Al-Taawoun.

Career
Al-Nabit began his career at his local club Al-Lewaa in Baqaa. On 14 August 2011, he left Al-Lewaa and joined the youth team of Al-Ahli. He spent 6 years at Al-Ahli and represented the team at every level besides the first team. On 18 July 2017, he left Al-Ahli and signed a 2-year contract with Medina based club Ohod. On 7 January 2019, Al-Nabit dropped down a division and signed a 6-month contract with Abha. Following Abha's promotion to the Pro League, Al-Nabit renewed his contract for a further year. On 2 January 2020, Al-Nabit signed a pre-contract agreement with Al-Taawoun and was set to join them following the expiry of his contract. On 1 February 2020, Al-Taawoun announced that they bought the remainder of his contract.

Career statistics

Club

International

International goals
Scores and results list Saudi Arabia's goal tally first.

Honours

Abha
MS League: 2018–19

References

External links 
 

1996 births
Living people
Saudi Arabian footballers
Saudi Arabia youth international footballers
Saudi Arabia international footballers
Al-Lewaa Club players
Al-Ahli Saudi FC players
Ohod Club players
Abha Club players
Al-Taawoun FC players
Saudi Professional League players
Saudi First Division League players
Association football midfielders
Association football forwards
People from Ha'il Province